Cellia may refer to:

 Cellia (subgenus), subgenus of mosquitos
 Kellia, a 4th-century Egyptian Christian monastic community in the Nitrian Desert